Shatov is a Russian masculine surname, its feminine counterpart is Shatova. It may refer to
Edward Shatov (born 1973), Russian Catholic priest
Oleg Shatov (born 1990), Russian football player 
Nikolay Shatov (1909–1992), Russian weightlifter
Panteleimon Shatov (born 1950), Russian Orthodox Bishop

Russian-language surnames